Candlestick is a 2014 British film starring Andrew Fitch, Isla Ure, Nigel Thomas and Tom Knight. It was directed by Christopher Presswell and was released in the United States on 11 April 2015.

Plot

A meeting of friends descends into a sinister game when one of them accuses the wife of his best friend of infidelity.

Cast
Andrew Fitch as Jack
Isla Ure as Vera
Nigel Thomas as Frank
Tom Knight as Major Burns
Dan March as Inspector Marcus Evans

Production
The film was shot in London during November 2012. Presswell has cited the work of Alfred Hitchcock, particularly Rope and Dial M for Murder, as an influence on the film.

Release
Candlestick made its UK debut on 8 October 2014 at the Aberdeen Film Festival, with further festival screenings at IndieCork, South African Horrorfest and the Bratislava International Film Festival.

In November 2014, Candlestick opened the 30 Dies Fantastic Film Festival in Andorra, and was among the first non-Chinese-language films shown at the Europe China Image Film Festival.

In January 2015 the company announced that the film would open in the United States on 11 April of that year, and be released on VOD, DVD and Blu-ray.

Reception
Following the film's Irish première, NextProjection called the film a "juicy jaunt of a tale," and said that "like a Raymond Chandler 'cannibalisation', Candlestick may feed off the familiar, but it's the sport with which it spits it back out that makes it feel so fresh".

The film won three awards at the 30 Dies Fantastic Film Festival, Andorra: best screenplay (Forgács W. András and Christopher Presswell); best original score (Jonathan Armandary); and best actor, shared by Andrew Fitch, Isla Ure, Nigel Thomas and Tom Knight.

The film received a mention for its screenplay at the Overlook: CinemAvvenire Film Festival 2014 in Rome.

Publicity
On 19 November 2015 a post on titled "This is how movies are delivered to your local theater" containing pictures of the film's DCP hard drive went viral, reaching the #1 spot on Reddit, and gathering widespread social media attention.

References

External links
 
 
 
 
 
 

2014 films
2014 thriller drama films
2014 independent films
2014 psychological thriller films
Films about adultery in the United Kingdom
Films set in London
British thriller drama films
2010s English-language films
2014 drama films
2010s British films